Hans Reffert (19 July 1946 – 21 February 2016) was a German musician and composer.

Although possibly best known for his work with Guru Guru, Reffert was involved with a number of ensembles, including Flute & Voice, Zauberfinger, Sanfte Liebe, and Schrammel & Slide. Reffert studied guitar with Sigi Schwab and flute and composition in Mannheim. He also created commissioned works for the National Theatre Mannheim and other theaters, as well as for cinema and television productions. He died on 22 February 2016 in Mannheim aged 69.

Discography

Solo 

 1988 Total Normal: Musik für Adolf Wölfli
 2008 Westlich Bb9

With Flute & Voice 
 1970 Imaginations of Light
 1995 Hello Rabbit (recorded 1973)
 1996 Drachenlieder (material from 1974 to 1975)

With Thomas Vogel 
 1976 Lieder des Thomas Vogel
 1978 Flüstern im Geschrei

With Werner Pöhlert 

 1976 Kollektiv Alte Musik

With Zauberfinger 
 c.1980 Slide
 1980 Shizzo Rock
 1981 Zauberfinger 2

With Borgward 
 1980 Perplex
 1982 Bermuda Dreieck / Vorwiegend Heiter

With Schlauch 
 1981 Grosse Gemeinsamkeit
 1984 Wenn die Stadt erwacht

With Idole 
 1982 Die Idole
 1982 Hautnah / Pfahl im Fleisch

With Guru Guru 
See: Guru Guru  During 1988, and again from 1997 to 2000

With Sanfte Liebe 
 1987 Sanfte Liebe
 1991 New Flowers

With Schrammel & Slide 
 1991 Deffert + Rörsam
 1993 Deux
 1995 HellBillies from Venus
 1997 Ja Ja
 1999 Famous for Not Being Famous
 2003 Pow Wow
 2011 Sieben/Seven

With Claus Boesser-Ferrarri 
 2003 Nachmittag eines Fauns

With Mani Neumeier 
 2010 Der Teufel und sein Guru

With Werner Goos 
 2011 Stone Cold & Broken
 2014 I Can't Stop the Voices in My Head

With Michael Bauer & Wolfgang Schuster 
 2015 Weltunnergangsblues

References

External links

 Hans Reffert Home Page
 Hans Reffert at Discogs

1946 births
2016 deaths
Krautrock
German male composers
German film score composers
Male film score composers